Nebria reymondi is a species of ground beetle in the Nebriinae subfamily that is endemic to Morocco.

References

reymondi
Beetles described in 1951
Beetles of North Africa
Endemic fauna of Morocco